Julahi (also Romanized as Jūlāhī, Jūlā’ī, and Jūle’ī) is a village in Dorunak Rural District, Zeydun District, Behbahan County, Khuzestan Province, Iran. At the 2006 census, its population was 112, in 27 families.

References 

Populated places in Behbahan County